MWHL may refer to two ice hockey leagues in the United States:

 Midwest Hockey League, based in Indiana, planned to operate in the 2009–10 season but was absorbed into the All American Hockey League
 Mountain West Hockey League, a senior league based in the west